
The Law of 4 October 1940 regarding foreign nationals of the Jewish race was a law enacted by the Vichy regime, which authorized and organized the internment of foreign Jews and marked the beginning of the policy of collaboration of the Vichy regime with Nazi Germany's plans for the  extermination of the Jews of Europe. This law was published in the Journal officiel de la République française on 18 October 1940.

The law was signed by Marshall Philippe Pétain and the main members of his government, one day after the Law on the status of Jews which provided a legal definition of the expression Jewish race and which contained a list of occupations forbidden to Jews. 

The Vichy regime was nominally independent, unlike the northern, Occupied zone, which was under direct occupation by Nazi Germany; but the Pétain regime didn't wait to be ordered to draw up antisemitic measures by the Nazis, but took them on their own initiative. Antisemitic measures began to be drawn up almost immediately after Pétain signed the Armistice of 22 June 1940, ending hostilities and establishing the terms of France's surrender to the Germans, including the division of France into the occupied and free zones.

See also 

 Collaboration with the Axis Powers during World War II
 French Fourth Republic
 French Third Republic
 German occupation of France
 History of the Jews in France
 Vichy anti-Jewish legislation
 Vichy France
 Vichy Holocaust collaboration timeline
 Zone libre

References 
Notes

Footnotes

Works cited

Further reading 

 

 .

 .

 .

 .

 

 .

 .

 .

External links   

 

1940 in France
Antisemitism in France
France in World War II
Jewish French history
Judaism in France
Legal history of France
Modern history of France
October 1940 events
Politics of World War II
Vichy France